Patrice Mourier (born 10 April 1962) is a French former wrestler, born in Lyon, who competed in the 1984 Summer Olympics, in the 1988 Summer Olympics, and in the 1992 Summer Olympics. He won the gold medal in the World championship in 1987, and in the European championship in 1990.  He is France's wrestling national coach since 2004.

References

External links
 

1962 births
Living people
Sportspeople from Lyon
Olympic wrestlers of France
Wrestlers at the 1984 Summer Olympics
Wrestlers at the 1988 Summer Olympics
Wrestlers at the 1992 Summer Olympics
French male sport wrestlers
20th-century French people
21st-century French people